The Diary of Alicia Keys is the second studio album by American singer Alicia Keys. It was released on December 2, 2003, by J Records. The album was recorded at several recording studios, and production was handled primarily by Keys with contributions from Kanye West and Kerry Brothers Jr., who described it as "an R&B album".

Upon its release, The Diary of Alicia Keys received generally positive reviews from music critics. The album debuted at number one on the US Billboard 200 chart, selling 618,000 copies in its first week. It became Keys' second consecutive number-one debut in the United States and spawned three top-ten singles. The Diary of Alicia Keys earned Keys three Grammy Awards at the 47th Annual Grammy Awards. The album has sold over five million units in the United States and over eight million copies worldwide.

Background and development
Keys' debut studio album Songs in A Minor was released on June 5, 2001. Debuting atop the US Billboard 200, it went on to sell over 6.2 million copies and earned Keys five Grammy Awards at the 44th Annual Grammy Awards, tying Keys with Lauryn Hill as the female artist with most Grammy Awards won in a single ceremony (the record has since been broken by Beyoncé and Adele). Keys embarked on the Songs in A Minor Tour (2001–2002) in support of the album; while touring, Keys started writing songs for her second studio album. Due to the extreme popularity of Songs in A Minor, there was a lot of pressure on The Diary of Alicia Keys to match or exceed that success. Speaking on the subject, album contributor Kerry Brothers, Jr. said in 2018:

Recording and production

Following the completion of the Songs in A Minor Tour, Keys started recording The Diary of Alicia Keys in late 2002; while touring, Keys solely wrote several songs for the album, including "Dragon Days" and the interlude "Feeling U, Feeling Me". Initial recording sessions took place at the Kampo Studio in Tribeca and the first song recorded was the album's closing track "Nobody Not Really", which "set the tone for the album" according to engineer Ann Mincieli. The album was mostly recorded at studios in New York City; some of the New York City recording sessions were interrupted by the Northeast blackout of 2003. In order to capture the 1960s–1970s sound she wanted on the album, Keys equipped her studio with "vintage" instruments. Among producers, Keys worked with Kerry Brothers, Jr., Kanye West, Timbaland, Dre & Vidal, Easy Mo Bee, D'wayne Wiggins and Kumasi. Dre & Vidal's Andre Harris stated he and Keys "crossed paths in the studio" while Dre & Vidal were working on Usher's album Confessions (2004) and started working together afterwards.

Timbaland-produced "Heartburn" was recorded at the Hit Factory Criteria in Miami. "If I Was Your Woman", a cover of "If I Were Your Woman" by Gladys Knight & the Pips, was originally recorded for Songs in A Minor (2001) but remained unreleased until it was reworked with the cover of "Walk on By" by Isaac Hayes; the original version was included on the 10th anniversary reissue of Songs in A Minor in 2011. Lellow, Keys' alter ego, was introduced on the album, making an appearance on "So Simple". Brothers stated: "Lellow is her alter ego. That was what we called her when she was in her hip-hop mode so it's dope they recorded her singing in one key and pitched her up to make it sound high-pitched." The final stage of the recording took place internationally–in Paris, London and Amsterdam–with Keys having already embarked on a promotional tour in support of The Diary of Alicia Keys. The final track recorded was the album's intro "Harlem's Nocturne".

Music and lyrics

Predominantly an R&B and soul album, The Diary of Alicia Keys was largely influenced by 1960s and 1970s music, with Keys calling music from that era "some of the best music ever created". Lyrically, the album mostly explores complexities of romantic relationships, following their different stages. However, some songs address social issues, such as materialism ("If I Ain't Got You") and war ("Wake Up"). The album opens with the intro "Harlem's Nocturne", a classical track with "hip-hop drums", which introduces the album as a diary in which Keys would express her thoughts. Horn-infused alternative hip hop song "Karma" follows; it contains excerpts from Violin Concerto in D major, Op. 77 by Johannes Brahms. Titled after the concept of karma, the song follows the narrator whose former lover wants to restart their relationship despite leaving her before, but she has moved on; the lover is now in the position she was once in, and in being rejected receives his just deserts ("what goes around comes around"). The third track "Heartburn" "marries the explosive brass and choppy guitars of a Blaxploitation soundtrack to a beat bearing the influence of visionary producer Timbaland". "If I Was Your Woman"/"Walk on By" is a double cover of "If I Were Your Woman" by Gladys Knight & the Pips and "Walk on By" by Isaac Hayes. The album's lead single "You Don't Know My Name" contains excerpts and a sample of "Let Me Prove My Love to You" by The Main Ingredient. An R&B-soul song, "You Don't Know My Name" follows Keys as a waitress who fell in love with a customer; the song is interrupted by a spoken-word interlude, which is Keys' phone call to her love interest in which she asks him out. Keys was inspired by Aaliyah's death and the September 11 attacks when writing the album's sixth track "If I Ain't Got You", as those events made her realize what's truly important in life. The soul-jazz song condemns materialism: "Some people want diamond rings / Some just want everything / But everything means nothing / If I ain't got you, yeah".

The album's title track "Diary" features Tony! Toni! Toné! on bass, piano, guitar, organ and Wurlitzer, while Jermaine Paul provides uncredited additional vocals; Stokley Williams was originally set to sing on the track but was replaced by Paul. The song instructs Keys' love interest to tell her his secrets and to think of her as "pages in [his] diary". Sal Cinquemani of Slant Magazine described the song as reminiscent of Marvin Gaye and Stevie Wonder's work. In an interview to Rolling Stone prior to the release of The Diary of Alicia Keys, Keys called "Dragon Days" and "So Simple" the most adventurous tracks from the album. "Dragon Days" features "bouncy keyboards, classic rock guitar licks, and sultry, surprisingly disco-fied vocal delivery" and follows Keys as a damsel in distress who needs to be saved by her "knight in shining armor". Following the anti-war song "Wake Up", "So Simple" is the album's tenth track, featuring an appearance from Keys' alter ego Lellow, whose verses see Keys' voice manipulated to sound high-pitched. Its lyrics follow a narrator seeking reconciliation with a former lover. The eleventh track, neo soul ballad "When You Really Love Someone", speaks about sacrifices one must make for their significant other. The interlude "Feeling U, Feeling Me" follows, featuring "a squawky synthesizer straight off Stevie Wonder's Innervisions". The thirteenth track "Slow Down" sees Keys as a narrator who feels like her relationship is going too fast and is asking her lover to "slow down". "Samsonite Man" is a neo soul song with Latin percussion and guitar. Its lyrics follow a narrator who's ending her relationship and telling her lover to leave; it was later revealed the song was about Keys' father, who abandoned her and her mother when she was two years old. The album closes with "Nobody Not Really", in which Keys sings: "Who really cares? / Who really cares / When I talk / What I feel / What I say? / Nobody not really". UK and Japanese editions of the album include bonus track "Streets of New York (City Life)", a hip hop song featuring Nas and Rakim. Sampling "N.Y. State of Mind" by Nas, the song is an "affectionate ode" to New York City.

Title and artwork
The album was titled The Diary of Alicia Keys due to it being conceived so each of its tracks acts as a diary entry, making the album itself a diary. In the intro "Harlem's Nocturne", Keys introduces it as such and says she would express her thoughts in it. Peter Edge, executive producer of The Diary of Alicia Keys and now-chairman and CEO of RCA Records, said about the title in 2018: 

The album cover for The Diary of Alicia Keys was photographed by Warwick Saint. A portrait of Keys, it features half of her face and body covered by a piano.

Release and promotion

The promotional tour for The Diary of Alicia Keys started in November 2003, before the album's production finished, in Europe; Keys performed the lead single "You Don't Know My Name" on television shows such as CD:UK and Top of the Pops. Keys returned to the United States to perform the song at the 2003 Vibe Awards on November 20, later performing on Good Morning America on November 26 and December 2, AOL Broadband Rocks! Live on December 1, Total Request Live on December 2, and The Tonight Show with Jay Leno on December 4 and 5. The Diary of Alicia Keys was first released on December 1, 2003, internationally, before being released in the United States the following day by J Records; its limited edition with a bonus DVD was released simultaneously. The US promotional tour continued in 2004, with Keys performing at WGCI-FM's Big Jam Slow Jams on February 13. In Germany, Keys performed "You Don't Know My Name" on Wetten, dass..? on February 28. Afterwards, Keys co-headlined the Verizon Ladies First Tour with Beyoncé and Missy Elliott in North America from March until April 2004.

After performing on Todays Toyota Concert Series on May 7, Keys embarked on a five-month international tour which visited various venues and festivals in Europe, Asia and Australia. She continued performing in the United States, performing "If I Ain't Got You" and "Diary" on The Early Shows Summer Concert Series on June 8, "If I Ain't Got You" at the 2004 MTV Video Music Awards on August 29, and "Heartburn" at 2004 Fashion Rocks on September 8. In September, a double-disc special edition (also titled collector's tour edition) was released outside the United States. Keys performed "Karma" at the 2004 World Music Awards on September 15, American Music Awards of 2004 on November 14, and the 2004 Billboard Music Awards on December 8. Following her performance of "If I Ain't Got You" at the 47th Annual Grammy Awards on February 13, 2005, Keys toured North America on her Diary Tour from February until April.

Singles
"You Don't Know My Name" was released as the lead single from The Diary of Alicia Keys on November 10, 2003. It peaked at number three on the US Billboard Hot 100 and atop the Hot R&B/Hip-Hop Songs, becoming her second Hot R&B/Hip-Hop Songs number-one. The song's accompanying music video, directed by Chris Robinson and Andrew Young, features Keys as a waitress at a restaurant and rapper Mos Def playing Michael Harris, her love interest. At the 47th Annual Grammy Awards (2005), the song won the Grammy Award for Best R&B Song. "You Don't Know My Name" was certified gold by the Recording Industry Association of America (RIAA) on August 11, 2020, for shipping 500,000 units in the United States.

"If I Ain't Got You" was released as the second single on February 23, 2004. It peaked at number four on the Billboard Hot 100 and became her second consecutive Hot R&B/Hip-Hop Songs number-one. Its accompanying music video, directed by Diane Martel, is set in a wintry New York City and features a cameo by rapper and actor Method Man as Keys' on-screen boyfriend. The song outpeaked its Billboard Hot 100 position on the 2004 Billboard Hot 100 year-end chart, placing at number three, while being number one on the Hot R&B/Hip-Hop Songs year-end chart. At the 47th Annual Grammy Awards, the song won for Best Female R&B Vocal Performance, while being nominated for Song of the Year. On August 11, 2020, "If I Ain't Got You" was certified quadruple platinum by the RIAA for shipments of four million units.

"Diary" was released as the third single on May 24, 2004. It became Keys' third consecutive Billboard Hot 100 top-ten single, peaking at number eight, while peaking at number two on the Hot R&B/Hip-Hop Songs. The song's music video, directed by Lamont "Liquid" Burrell, Rod Isaacs, Jeff Robinson, and Brian Campbell, contains footage of several live concerts from both the Verizon Ladies First Tour (2004), which Keys took part in, and her own Diary Tour (2005). At the 47th Annual Grammy Awards, the song was nominated for Best R&B Performance by a Duo or Group with Vocals. "Diary" was certified gold by the RIAA on August 11, 2020.

"Karma" was released as the fourth and final single on November 1, 2004. It became the album's only single to miss the top ten on both Billboard Hot 100 and Hot R&B/Hip-Hop Songs, peaking at numbers 20 and 17 on the charts, respectively. The music video for "Karma", directed by Chris Robinson and Keys herself, was filmed over three days in August 2004, with parts shot in New York City and at Casa de Campo's Altos de Chavón amphitheatre. At the 2005 MTV Video Music Awards, the video earned Keys the award for Best R&B Video. "Karma" was certified gold by the RIAA twice–on September 27, 2005, and on August 11, 2020.

Critical reception

The Diary of Alicia Keys received generally positive reviews from critics; it holds an average score of 71, based on 17 reviews, at Metacritic. The Times said that the album "confirmed her place in musical history". Critics described Keys' music as neo soul and contemporary R&B. Slant Magazines Sal Cinquemani said that it "triumphs" the neo soul "achievements" of Songs in A Minor and is "a deft mix of modernism and classicism, not to mention street and class." Q magazine called it "a proper soul album which hooks you with the first pneumatic beat and draws you deeper with every heady atmosphere and vivid emotion." Jon Pareles, writing in The New York Times, claimed that "it has taken The Diary of Alicia Keys ... to testify that soul songwriting can survive" and felt that the album "echoes familiar soul sounds, but Ms. Keys sounds undaunted by her sources, and she's learning fast." Rob Sheffield, writing in Rolling Stone, called the album "an assured, adult statement, steeped in the complicated love life and musical dreams of an ambitious young woman who has absorbed enough Nina Simone and Aretha Franklin records to live up to the soul promise of 'Harlem's Nocturne'." Dimitri Ehrlich of Vibe said that Keys is able to "sustain drama over the course" of the "masterful" album, which appropriates the "minimalist" productions of classic soul. Kris Ex of Blender called it "an enthusiastic album full of masterful strokes and electrifying intensity."

In a mixed review, Josh Tyrangiel of Time said that the album's first six songs are "models of how to make nostalgic music that is not anti-present", but the second half "sags". David Browne, writing in Entertainment Weekly, similarly said that the second half "drifts into a narcotized semi-slumber of one earnest, samey retro-soul piano ballad after another." Laura Sinagra of The Village Voice felt that the album's songs lack hooks and other "surface content", sounding instead like unfinished vocal sketches. Mark Anthony Neal of PopMatters said that it only shows "fleeting glimpses" of Keys' actual sensibilities and said that, although it "clearly evinces Keys's growth as an artist since Songs in A Minor," the album is "clearly laboring to be relevant to the current marketplace and thus suffers from a serious lack of cohesion. Alexis Petridis, writing in The Guardian, found it creatively safe and marred by "anodyne slow numbers studded with knowing references to old records". Uncut found Keys' lyrics boring and filled with a "litany of cliche and hackneyed need-a-man" wailing. Robert Christgau of The Village Voice rated the album a "dud", indicating "a bad record whose details rarely merit further thought."

Accolades
The Diary of Alicia Keys was named the seventh best album of 2004 by Blender. At the 47th Annual Grammy Awards in 2005, it won the Grammy Award for Best R&B Album, while its songs earned Keys two other awards, including Best Female R&B Vocal Performance for "If I Ain't Got You" and Best R&B Song for "You Don't Know My Name". Keys also won three Soul Train Music Awards–Best R&B/Soul Single – Female for "You Don't Know My Name" in 2004 and "If I Ain't Got You" in 2005, and Best R&B/Soul Album – Female for The Diary of Alicia Keys. In 2007, the National Association of Recording Merchandisers (NARM) and the Rock and Roll Hall of Fame released a list of what they termed "The Definitive 200 Albums of All Time"; The Diary of Alicia Keys was ranked at number 129 on the list. The album was also ranked at number 129 on the New York Daily Newss list of Top 200 Albums of All Time, and number 277 in the 2020 revision of Rolling Stone's 500 Greatest Albums of All Time list.

Commercial performance
The Diary of Alicia Keys debuted at number one on the US Billboard 200 chart, selling 618,000 copies in its first week. This became Keys' second consecutive number-one debut. It was the highest first-week sales by a female artist of the year. In its second week, the album dropped to number two on the chart, selling an additional 324,000 copies, but returned to the top in its third week with 370,000 units sold. The album spent 88 weeks on the chart, leaving at number 198 in 2005. By January 2006, the album had sold 4.4 million copies in the United States. On August 11, 2020, the album was certified quintuple platinum by the Recording Industry Association of America (RIAA) for combined sales and album-equivalent units of five million units in the United States.

In the United Kingdom, The Diary of Alicia Keys debuted at number 13 on the UK Albums Chart and atop the UK R&B Albums Chart. The album was certified platinum by the British Phonographic Industry (BPI) for shipping 300,000 units. It reached the top ten in Finland, France, Germany, Greece, the Netherlands and Norway, while peaking at number one in Switzerland and number five on the European Top 100 Albums. By November 2007, the album had sold over eight million copies worldwide.

Track listingSample credits'''
 "Karma" contains excerpts from Violin Concerto in D major, Op. 77 by Johannes Brahms
 "Streets of New York" contains a sample of "N.Y. State of Mind" by Nas (written by Eric Barrier, Nasir Jones, Chris Martin, William Griffin)
 "You Don't Know My Name" contains excerpts and a sample of "Let Me Prove My Love to You" performed by The Main Ingredient (written by J. R. Bailey, Mel Kent, Ken Williams)
 "If I Was Your Woman" is a cover of "If I Were Your Woman" by Gladys Knight & the Pips (written by Gloria Jones, Clarence McMurray, Pam Sawyer)
 "Walk on By" is a cover of and contains excerpts from "Walk on By" performed by Isaac Hayes (written by Burt Bacharach, Hal David)

Personnel
Credits adapted from the liner notes of The Diary of Alicia Keys''.

Musicians
Alicia Keys – clavinet, instrumentation, keyboards, multi instruments, piano, Rhodes, string arrangements, synthesizers, synthesizer piano, backing vocals, vocals
Sanford Allen – concertmaster, violin 
Elijah Baker – bass 
Julien Barber – viola 
Katreese Barnes – background vocals 
Pablo Batista – percussion 
Richard Brice – viola 
Kurt Briggs – violin 
Kerry Brothers Jr. – digital programming, instrumentation , drums 
Avril Brown – violin 
Stockley Carmichael – background vocals 
Fred Cash Jr. – bass 
Robert Chausow – viola 
Ray Chew – strings arrangement and conductor 
Dre & Vidal – instrumentation 
Ronnie Drayton – guitar 
Darryl Dixon – horns 
Marisol Espada – cello 
Barry Finclair – viola 
Eileen Folson – cello 
Onree Gill – Hammond B3 , Rhodes 
L. Green – background vocals 
Sharief Hobley – guitar 
Andricka Hall – background vocals 
Stanley Hunte – violin 
Paul John – drums 
Steve Jordan – drums 
Kumasi – digital programming, additional synths 
Gwendolyn Laster – violin 
John Legend – background vocals 
Harold Lilly – background vocals 
Hugh McCracken – guitar 
Melissa Meell – cello 
Lori Miller – violin 
Cindy Mizelle – background vocals 
Caryl Paisner – cello 
Jermaine Paul – background vocals 
Marion Pinheiro – violin 
Ricky Quinones – guitar 
Artie Reynolds – bass 
Maxine Roach – viola 
Steve "Styles" Rodriguez – bass 
Joe Romano – horns 
Erika Rose – background vocals 
Tim Christian Riley – piano 
John "Jubu" Smith – guitar 
Taneisha Smith – background vocals 
Denise Stoudmire – background vocals 
Dale Stuckenbruck – violin 
Peter VanDerwater – viola 
Arcell Vickers – organ 
Alexander Vselensky – violin 
David Watson – horns ; saxophone, flute 
Willie Weeks – bass 
Carl "Rev" Wheeler – Wurlitzer, organ 
Artie White – guitar 
D'wayne Wiggins – sitar, bass ; guitar 
Jessica Wilson – background vocals 
Xin Zhao – violin

Additional personnel
Alli – art director, design
Chris LeBeau – art production
Warwick Saint – photography
Nicole Tucker – hair stylist
Patti Wilson – stylist

Technical personnel
Alicia Keys – executive producer, producer
Kerry Brothers Jr. – producer; recording 
Dre & Vidal - producers 
Kumasi – producer 
Timbaland – producer 
Easy Mo Bee – digital programming , producer 
Kanye West – producer 
D'wayne Wiggins – producer 
Peter Edge – executive producer
Jeff Robinson – executive producer
Tony Black – recording engineer, mixing
Vincent DiLorenzo – additional recording 
Dan Gautreau – recording assistant 
Walter Millsap III – recording 
Ann Mincieli – additional recording 
Russell Elevado – mixing 
Alan Ford – assistant mixing 
Manny Marroquin – mixing
Rabeka Tuinei – assistant mixing 
Pat Viala – mixing 
Herb Powers Jr. – mastering

Charts

Weekly charts

Year-end charts

Decade-end charts

All-time charts

Certifications

Release history

See also
Album era
List of Billboard 200 number-one albums of 2003
List of Billboard 200 number-one albums of 2004
List of Billboard number-one R&B albums of 2003
List of Billboard number-one R&B albums of 2004
List of UK R&B Albums Chart number ones of 2003

Notes

References

Bibliography

External links
 
 

2003 albums
Alicia Keys albums
Albums produced by Alicia Keys
Albums produced by DJ Premier
Albums produced by Dre & Vidal
Albums produced by Easy Mo Bee
Albums produced by Kanye West
Albums produced by Timbaland
J Records albums
Grammy Award for Best R&B Album